Performance Racing is a Swedish racing team based in Great Britain, involved in many areas of motorsport. The team has been managed since 1999 by Bobby Issazadhe.

History 
The Performance Racing business was founded in Sweden, in 1999, to concentrate various motorsport activities into one source. The business was bought by Issazadhe in 2000 to manage his own racing team.

In the beginning, in 1999 and 2000, the team ran in Europa Cup Formula Opel. It also became involved in Formula Three in Germany, Sweden and Great Britain.

Since 2006–07, Performance Racing manage the A1 Team Pakistan in the A1 Grand Prix World Cup of Motorsport. In January 2008, the team became the managers of A1 Team Indonesia.

The team joined the International Formula Master championship in 2008.

Results

Timeline

References

External links 
 

Swedish auto racing teams
1999 establishments in the United Kingdom
Auto racing teams established in 1999
A1 Grand Prix racing teams
British Formula Three teams
German Formula 3 teams
Acceleration teams